Martina Hingis and Arantxa Sánchez-Vicario were the defending champions but only Sánchez-Vicario competed that year with Anna Kournikova.

Kournikova and Sánchez-Vicario lost in the final 6–4, 6–2 against Lindsay Davenport and Natasha Zvereva.

Seeds
Champion seeds are indicated in bold text while text in italics indicates the round in which those seeds were eliminated.

 Lindsay Davenport /  Natasha Zvereva (champions)
 Lisa Raymond /  Rennae Stubbs (quarterfinals)
 Elena Likhovtseva /  Jana Novotná (semifinals)
 Anna Kournikova /  Arantxa Sánchez-Vicario (final)

Draw

External links
 1998 Porsche Tennis Grand Prix Doubles Draw

Porsche Tennis Grand Prix
1998 WTA Tour